is a Japanese manga series created by Kazuhiro Fujita. It was serialized in Shogakukan's Weekly Shōnen Sunday from March 2008 to April 2014, with its chapters collected in twenty-nine tankōbon volumes.

Plot
A high-school student named Gekko Iwasaki is struck by moonlight and becomes an executioner of "moonlight regulation", who makes characters escaping from fairy tales come back to them.

Characters

An aggressive high school boy of few friends. His family owns a ramen shop. He is charged, in spite of himself, to carry out the "moonlight regulation".

A member of a drama club who is popular in Gekko's high school.

A heroine escaping from the fairy tale. She is crazy for speed.

Publication
Written and illustrated by Kazuhiro Fujita, Moonlight Act was serialized in Shogakukan's Weekly Shōnen Sunday from March 26, 2008, to April 9, 2014. Shogakukan collected its 286 individual chapters in twenty-nine tankōbon volumes, released from June 18, 2008, to May 16, 2014.

Volume list

Reception
Moonlight Act was nominated for the Seiun Award in the Best Comic category in 2015.

Notes

References

Further reading

External links
  
 

2008 manga
Adventure anime and manga
Fantasy anime and manga
Shogakukan manga
Shōnen manga